In applied probability, a regenerative process is a class of stochastic process with the property that certain portions of the process can be treated as being statistically independent of each other. This property can be used in the derivation of theoretical properties of such processes.

History
Regenerative processes were first defined by Walter L. Smith in Proceedings of the Royal Society A in 1955.

Definition
A regenerative process is a stochastic process with time points at which, from a probabilistic point of view, the process restarts itself. These time point may themselves be determined by the evolution of the process. That is to say, the process {X(t), t ≥ 0} is a regenerative process if there exist time points 0 ≤ T0 < T1 < T2 < ... such that the post-Tk process {X(Tk + t) : t ≥ 0}

 has the same distribution as the post-T0 process {X(T0 + t) : t ≥ 0}
 is independent of the pre-Tk process {X(t) : 0 ≤ t < Tk}

for k ≥ 1. Intuitively this means a regenerative process can be split into i.i.d. cycles.

When T0 = 0, X(t) is called a nondelayed regenerative process. Else, the process is called a delayed regenerative process.

Examples
Renewal processes are regenerative processes, with T1 being the first renewal.
Alternating renewal processes, where a system alternates between an 'on' state and an 'off' state. 
A recurrent Markov chain is a regenerative process, with T1 being the time of first recurrence. This includes Harris chains.
Reflected Brownian motion is a regenerative process (where one measures the time it takes particles to leave and come back).

Properties
By the renewal reward theorem, with probability 1,

A measurable function of a regenerative process is a regenerative process with the same regeneration time

References

Stochastic processes